Greene is a census-designated place (CDP) and the primary village in the town of Greene, Androscoggin County, Maine, United States. It is northeast of the center of the county, and in the center of the town of Greene. U.S. Route 202 passes through the village, leading southwest  to the center of Lewiston and northeast  to Augusta, the state capital.

Greene was first listed as a CDP prior to the 2020 census.

Demographics

References 

Census-designated places in Androscoggin County, Maine
Census-designated places in Maine